Malawi competed at the 1988 Summer Olympics in Seoul, South Korea. Sixteen competitors, all men, took part in sixteen events in three sports.

Competitors
The following is the list of number of competitors in the Games.

Athletics

Men's 10.000 metres
 Charles Naveko
 Heat – 31:23.53 (→ did not advance, 39th place out of 48)

Men's Marathon
 John Mwathiwa — 2:51.43 (→ 87th place, out of 98)

Boxing

Cycling

Four cyclists represented Malawi in 1988.

Men's road race
 Dyton Chimwaza
 George Nayeja
 Amadu Yusufu

Men's team time trial
 Dyton Chimwaza
 Daniel Kaswanga
 George Nayeja
 Amadu Yusufu

References

External links
Official Olympic Reports

Nations at the 1988 Summer Olympics
1988
Oly